These hits topped the Ultratop 50 in 2019.

See also
List of number-one albums of 2019 (Belgium)
2019 in music

References

Ultratop 50
Belgium Ultratop 50
2019